CHG may refer to:

Transport 
 Challenge Aero, a Ukrainian airline
 Chaoyang Airport, in Liaoning Province, China
 Charing railway station, in England
 Chinchpokli railway station, of the Mumbai Suburban Railway

Other uses 
 Caucasus Hunter-Gatherer, ancient human genetic lineage 
 Chagatai language
 CHG International, an American real estate developer
 CHG Healthcare Services, an American health care company
 Chlorhexidine, a disinfectant and antiseptic